Camotlán may refer to a number of places and languages in Mexico:

Geography
San Lucas Camotlán, Oaxaca
Santiago Camotlán, Oaxaca
Santa María Camotlán, Oaxaca

Languages
Camotlan Mixe language